Winnipeg/St. Andrews Airport or St. Andrews Airport  is a general aviation facility located  north northeast of Winnipeg, in the Rural Municipality of St. Andrews, Manitoba, Canada. In 2011 it was Canada's 16th busiest airport by aircraft movements.

St. Andrews Airport is primarily used for commercial operations, particularly flight training, air charters, scheduled passenger service, and air ambulances.

Scheduled passenger service is primarily provided by Northway Aviation which operates routes to small communities in Northern Manitoba.

Nav Canada provides air traffic control services at St. Andrews Airport and the surrounding area.

Airlines and destinations

See also
 List of airports in the Winnipeg area

References

External links
 St. Andrews Airport

Certified airports in Manitoba